Partido Democrático can refer to:

 Democratic Party (East Timor)
 Democratic Party (Nicaragua)
 Democratic Party (Portugal)
 Democratic Party (United States)
 Democratic Party (Italy)